Jorge Flores (born February 13, 1977) is an American former soccer midfielder who spent four seasons with the Dallas Burn in Major League Soccer. He was a member of the U.S. teams at the 1993 FIFA U-17 World Championship and 1997 FIFA World Youth Championship.

Club
Flores attended Paramount High School in Paramount, California, graduating in 1994. He was an outstanding youth soccer player. In February 1996, the Dallas Burn selected Flores in the 11th round (103rd overall) of the 1996 MLS Inaugural Player Draft. He became a starter with the Burn while continuing to play for the youth national teams. In 1998, he saw limited time due to a stress fracture. In 1999, he played one game for the Boston Bulldogs in the USL A-League and two on loan to the MLS Pro 40. The Burn released him in 2000.

International
In 1993, Flores played every minute for the United States U-17 men's national soccer team at the 1993 FIFA U-17 World Championship. In 1997, he was a member of the United States U-20 men's national soccer team which went to the second round of the 1997 FIFA World Youth Championship. On October 10, 1996, Flores played the first half in the United States men's national soccer team loss to Peru.

References

External links
FIFA Player Profile

1977 births
Living people
American soccer players
Boston Bulldogs (soccer) players
FC Dallas players
MLS Pro-40 players
United States men's international soccer players
Major League Soccer players
A-League (1995–2004) players
United States men's youth international soccer players
United States men's under-20 international soccer players
Soccer players from California
Association football midfielders